Louis Marius Mora (23 June 1921 – 22 February 2006) was a French cross-country skier who competed in the 1948 Winter Olympics.

References

1921 births
2006 deaths
French male cross-country skiers
Olympic cross-country skiers of France
Cross-country skiers at the 1948 Winter Olympics